David M. Readinger (born December 23, 1935) is an American politician in the state of Iowa.

Readinger was born in Des Moines, Iowa and attended Drake University. A Republican, he served in the Iowa House of Representatives from 1973 to 1977 (59th district) and the Iowa Senate from 1977 to 1989 (42nd district from 1983 to 1989 and 30th district 1977 to 1983).

References

1935 births
Living people
Politicians from Des Moines, Iowa
Drake University alumni
Businesspeople from Iowa
Republican Party members of the Iowa House of Representatives
Republican Party Iowa state senators